Roger Dod, DD, Fellow of Pembroke Hall, Cambridge and Archdeacon of Salop, was Bishop of Meath from 6 November 1605 until his death on 27 July 1608.

References

1608 deaths
Fellows of Pembroke College, Cambridge
Bishops of Meath
Archdeacons of Salop